William Sprigg Hall (July 9, 1832 – February 25, 1875) was an American lawyer and politician.

Hall was born in Anne Arundel County, Maryland and went to Saint John's College in Maryland. He moved to Saint Paul, Minnesota with his wife in 1854 and was admitted to the Minnesota bar. Hall served as the Minnesota Superintendent of Common Schools from 1856 to 1858. He then served in the Minnesota Senate from 1857 to 1860 and was a Democrat. Hall then served as the Minnesota Court of Common Pleas judge from 1866 until his death in 1875. He died while on a train returning to Minnesota from the eastern United States.

References

1832 births
1875 deaths
People from Anne Arundel County, Maryland
Minnesota lawyers
Politicians from Saint Paul, Minnesota
Minnesota state court judges
Democratic Party Minnesota state senators